The 1976 SMU Mustangs football team represented Southern Methodist University (SMU) as a member of the Southwest Conference (SWC) during the 1976 NCAA Division I football season. Led by first-year head coach Ron Meyer, the Mustangs compiled an overall record of 3–8 (2–6 in SWC, seventh).

Hired in January, Meyer was previously the head coach at the University of Nevada, Las Vegas (UNLV), then in Division II.

Schedule

Roster

References

External links
YouTube – Ron Meyer's initial press conference: January 23, 1976

1976 Southwest Conference football season
SMU Mustangs football seasons
SMU Mustangs football